Garry Cooper is an English actor.

He was born in Hull, East Yorkshire, on 2 June 1955. Garry trained at Drama Centre, London and has worked extensively in film, television and theatre.

Filmography

External links
 

1955 births
Living people
Male actors from Kingston upon Hull